Nice Guys Sleep Alone is a 1999 romantic comedy film written and directed by Stu Pollard. The film is based on a book of the same title, written by Bruce Feirstein.

Synopsis
A young man in Louisville sees his dating failures are related to his always being nice. All of his dates end up going with the rude, obnoxious guys. Deciding to change his way, he goes after a new acquaintance, who unfortunately is tired of the male boors she meets and is seeking Mr. Right – the rose-bearing guy who wants to be nice to her.

Cast
 Sean O'Bryan as Carter
 Vanessa Marcil as Erin
 Sybil Temchen as Maggie
 Michael Greene as Slick Willie
 Brenda James as Kate
 William Sanderson as Rufus
 Susannah Cranage as Nancy
 Blake Steury as Pat
 Derek McGrath as Eddie

Release
The film's festival debut came at the Gothenburg Film Festival to a sold-out crowd. In the United States, Nice Guys Sleep Alone was screened at multiple film festivals and locations in the Midwest.

According to a 2012 article in The New Republic, the film became the first Netflix exclusive, when filmmaker Stu Pollard sold the company hundreds of unsold copies of the DVD.

References

External links

1999 films
1999 romantic comedy films
Films shot in Kentucky
1990s English-language films